LGX may refer to:

 Yggdrasil Linux/GNU/X (LGX), a discontinued early Linux distro that was available as a Live CD
 GM LGX, a GM High Feature engine
 Luxembourg Green Exchange (LGX), on the Luxembourg Stock Exchange
 Lugh Ganane Airport (IATA airport code LGX), Luuq, Somalia
 Langxi County (region code LGX), Anhui, China; see List of administrative divisions of Anhui

See also